Tang Valley is one of the four valleys of Bumthang District, Bhutan.

It is located 11 km away from Jakar, the administrative center of Bumthang District, Bhutan. It trails higher up the lake called Mebartsho.

Etymology 
Guru Rinpoche in his attempt to subdue Khikha Rathoe, a son of Trisong Detsen, flew Khikha Rathoe and his ministers on a wooden aeroplane. As the aeroplane flew higher it caught on fire and Guru Rimpoche landed it on a rock at a valley in Bumthang. It is believed that the valley was named after the sound the aeroplane made on landing: 'Tang'.

References

Resource 
 Lonely Planet, p.177
 TANG VALLEY

Valleys of Bhutan